Sirdarreh (also Romanized as Sīrdarreh; also known as Gāv Godār) is a village in Pirsalman Rural District, in the Central District of Asadabad County, Hamadan Province, Iran. At the 2006 census, its population was 500, in 133 families.

References 

Populated places in Asadabad County